EPN may refer to:
End Polio Now, the Polio eradication campaign of Rotary International and the World Health Organization 
 Economic Prosperity Network, a global alliance initiative of the Trump administration
 EPN (insecticide)
 Effective perceived noise, a measure of aircraft noise
 Electronic Payments Network, an electronic clearing house
 Enrique Peña Nieto, President of Mexico 2012–2018
 Enterprise private network, an intranet in a large organisation 
 Entomopathogenic nematode, thread worm that kills insects
 Epsin, a membrane protein
 Esplanade MRT station, Singapore (MRT station abbreviation)
 EUREF Permanent Network, a European GPS network
 National Polytechnic School (Ecuador), a university in Quito